The Better Sex is a television game show in the United States where men competed against women in a "battle of the sexes" format. The Mark Goodson-Bill Todman production ran on ABC from July 18, 1977 to January 13, 1978. The show had two hosts, one male and one female; each acted as leader of a team of the appropriate sex. The male host was Bill Anderson and the female host was Sarah Purcell. Gene Wood was the announcer.

Game play
The show pitted two teams of six men and six women in a battle-of-the-sexes elimination game. One member of the team in control was asked a question, either general-knowledge or survey. The contestant was then handed a card which contained the correct answer and a bluff answer. The player's job was to choose which answer to use to try to fool the opposing team/sex. After the contestant made his/her choice, up to three members of the other team decided to either agree or disagree on the answer. Only two could agree or disagree and once they did, the correct answer was then revealed. If the two players made an incorrect judgment, they were knocked out of the game. If they made a correct judgment, they stayed in the game and the player offering the answer was knocked out along with a teammate of the opposing team's choice; additionally, that team took control of the next question. When a team was down to two players and could not agree whether an answer was correct or a bluff, the first player was given the option to change his/her judgment, or stay with his/her original choice.

The first team to eliminate the other won the game, $1,000, and a chance to play for $5,000 in the bonus game.

Bonus game
In the bonus game, the winning team faced 30 members of the opposite sex in the studio audience. One at a time, each team member was asked a question, then was handed a card which showed the correct answer only. The contestant could use that answer or come up with a bluff of his or her own. After the player gave an answer, the audience members then voted to agree or disagree on the answer. Each audience member held a paddle-shaped electronic device which displayed their choice. The correct answer was then revealed, and any audience members who voted wrong (or failed to cast a vote in the allotted time) were eliminated and sat down.

Play continued until all six questions were played. If any audience members were left standing, the team lost and the audience survivors split $500. However, if all 30 audience members were knocked out in up to six questions, the winning team split $5,000.

Teams stayed on the show until they lost twice or accrued at least $20,000 in total winnings. By December 1977, it increased to $30,000.

Music
The theme song is called "Hormonal Imbalance", composed by Score Productions.

Broadcast history
Like most shows that aired at noon ET/11:00AM CT/MT/PT, some affiliates did not carry the show. It aired opposite The Young and the Restless on CBS and initially two NBC game shows: Shoot for the Stars then To Say the Least. In January 1978, when both One Life to Live and General Hospital expanded from 45 minutes to an hour, the series was placed on hiatus; The $20,000 Pyramid took over the time slot. The show was ultimately canceled by ABC later that year. In 1998, Game Show Network used this show for an episode of their comedy series Faux Pause. On September 30, 2018, Buzzr aired two episodes as part of their annual "Lost & Found" series of specials.

International versions
Like its American counterpart, most international versions that were based on this format had a shorter-run in their respective countries as well.

Australia
The Australian version of The Better Sex aired on Channel Nine (or as the Nine Network) in 1978. It was hosted by Mike Preston and Ann Sidney, and was produced by Reg Grundy.

The theme music and incidental tracks for the Australian version were composed by Jack Grimsley.

France
A short-lived French version aired on Antenne 2 from 1991 until 1992 under the name Question de Charme ("Question of Charm") hosted by Georges Beller and Daniela Lumbroso. In 2010, the format was acquired by TF1 for a potential revival of the show as a primetime series in 2011. However, it was scrapped later on.

Italy
In 1978, a short-lived Italian version aired on Rai 2 under the name Il Sesso Forte("The Stronger Sex") hosted by Enrica Bonaccorti and Michele Gammino. It aired for only 22 episodes.

The Netherlands
A short-lived Dutch version aired on RTL 4 (originally RTL Véronique) under the name De Betere Sexe ("The Better Sex") hosted by Ruud ter Weijden and Sandra Reemer in 1990. On June 6 (or 6 June) 2017, Ms. Reemerhad passed away due to her long battle with Breast Cancer at the age of 66.

United Kingdom
Only two short-lived versions ran. The first incarnation originally ran in the STV region of ITV (The rest of ITV broadcast the series over the summer 1978) as The Better Sex, hosted by Jack McLaughlin and Lesley Blair in 1978. 13 years later, the series was revived on BBC1 in 1991 - only this time, under the title Who's Bluffing Who?, hosted by Ulrika Jonsson and Richard Cartridge. It was axed after seven episodes.

Elsewhere
Other foreign versions of The Better Sex ran in:
Germany
Scotland
Wales

References

External links
 
 Article about the short-lived French adaptation of "The Better Sex" called Question de Charme
 Who's Bluffing Who? - 1991

American Broadcasting Company original programming
1970s American game shows
1977 American television series debuts
1978 American television series endings
Television series by Mark Goodson-Bill Todman Productions
1970s Australian game shows
1970s British game shows